A utility aircraft is a general-purpose light airplane or helicopter, usually used for transporting people, freight or other supplies, but is also used for other duties when more specialized aircraft are not required or available.

The term can also refer to an aircraft type certificated under American, Canadian, European or Australian regulations as a Utility Category Aircraft, which indicates that it is permitted to conduct limited aerobatics. The approved maneuvers include chandelles, lazy eights, spins and steep turns over 60° of bank.

In the United States, military utility aircraft are given the prefix U in their designations.

See also
 FAR Part 23 (refers to "utility category" in United States aviation regulations)
 Utility helicopter
 Angel Flight

References

Aircraft by type